Patrick Gustard (born 14 September 1971) is a Jamaican cricket umpire. He stood in matches in the 2016–17 Regional Four Day Competition and the 2016–17 Regional Super50. He stood in his first Twenty20 International (T20I) match on 15 January 2020, between the West Indies and Ireland.

See also
 List of Twenty20 International cricket umpires

References

1971 births
Living people
Jamaican cricket umpires
West Indian Twenty20 International cricket umpires
People from Clarendon Parish, Jamaica